South Wales East is an electoral region of the Senedd, consisting of eight constituencies. The region elects 12 members, eight directly elected constituency members and four additional members. The electoral region was first used in 1999, when the National Assembly for Wales was created.

Each constituency elects one Member of the Senedd by the first past the post electoral system, and the region as a whole elects four additional or top-up Members of the Senedd, to create a degree of proportional representation. The additional member seats are allocated from closed lists by the D'Hondt method, with constituency results being taken into account in the allocation.

County boundaries

The region covers the whole of the preserved county of Gwent and part of the preserved county of Mid Glamorgan. The rest of Mid Glamorgan is mostly within the South Wales Central electoral region and partly within the South Wales West region.

Electoral region profile
The region is one of contrasts; it includes the city of Newport, along with the town of Caerphilly. It also takes in the working-class former iron town of Merthyr Tydfil, one of the most deprived towns in the UK, but also rural Monmouthshire, one of the most affluent parts of Wales.

Constituencies
The eight constituencies have the names and boundaries of constituencies of the House of Commons of the Parliament of the United Kingdom (Westminster):

Assembly members and Members of the Senedd

Constituency AMs and MSs

Regional list AMs and MSs

N.B. This table is for presentation purposes only

2021 Senedd election

2021 Senedd election additional members

Regional MSs elected 2021

2016 Welsh Assembly election additional members

Regional AMs elected 2016

2011 Welsh Assembly election additional members

Regional AMs elected 2011

2007 Welsh Assembly election additional members

On 8 December 2009, Mohammad Asghar, Plaid Cymru's list member for South Wales East, defected to the Conservative Party. This gave Plaid one AM, and the Conservatives two.

2003 Welsh Assembly additional members

1999 Welsh Assembly additional members

Notes

References

Senedd electoral regions